A Man of Destiny is a 1938 novel by F. J. Thwaites. It was Thwaites' 12th novel.

Plot
Peter Ashton kills the man responsible for his mother's death. He is sent to gaol but escapes.

References

External links
A Man of Destiny at AustLit

1938 Australian novels